Monstera dissecta is a species of flowering plant in the genus Monstera and family Araceae.

Distribution 
It is native to Brazil Acre, Tocantins, Amazônia, Goiás, and Cerrado.

It has also been found native in Colombia, Panama, Costa Rica, Nicaragua, Honduras, Guatemala, and Belize.

References 

dissecta